The Aldan (Sakha and ) is the second-longest, right tributary of the Lena in the Sakha Republic in eastern Siberia.

The river was part of the River Route to Okhotsk. In 1639 Ivan Moskvitin ascended the rivers Aldan and Maya and crossed to the Ulya to reach the Sea of Okhotsk.

Its basin is known for gold and for Cambrian fossils.

Course
The Aldan rises in the Stanovoy Mountains southwest of Neryungri. It flows roughly in a northeast / ENE direction south of the Lena Plateau across the Aldan Highlands, where it forms the northern border of the Sunnagyn Range. Then it flows past Aldan and through Tommot, Ust-Maya, Eldikan and Khandyga before turning northwest. In its last stretch it flanks the southern slopes of the Verkhoyansk Range and joins the Lena near Batamay.

Tributaries
The river's main tributaries are the following:
From the right
Timpton 
Uchur
Maya
Khamna
Allakh-Yun
Khanda
Tyry
Eastern Khandyga
Tompo
Khandiga
Baray
Tukulan
Kele
Tumara
Nuora
From the left
Amedichi
Chuga
Yungyuele
Bilir
Notora
Kuoluma
Amga
Tatta
Tanda.

See also
List of rivers of Russia

References

External links

Rivers of the Sakha Republic
Physiographic provinces
Central Yakutian Lowland